The white-winged apalis (Apalis chariessa) is a species of bird in the family Cisticolidae.
It is found in Kenya, Malawi, Mozambique, and Tanzania.
Its natural habitats are subtropical or tropical moist lowland forest and subtropical or tropical moist montane forest.
It is threatened by habitat loss.

References

white-winged apalis
Birds of East Africa
white-winged apalis
Taxonomy articles created by Polbot